Jan Gadomski (24 June 1889, in Czatkowice, Lesser Poland Voivodeship, Russian Poland – 2 January 1966) was a Polish astronomer.

At the Jagiellonian University Observatory he made systematic observations of eclipsing binary stars. The crater Gadomski on the Moon is named after him.

External links
 Gadomski, Jan (in Polish).

1889 births
1966 deaths
20th-century Polish astronomers
Academic staff of Jagiellonian University
People from Kraków County
Place of death missing